Harpalus metallinus is a species of ground beetle in the subfamily Harpalinae. It was described by Édouard Ménétries in 1836.

References

metallinus
Beetles described in 1836